Ariel Mastov (born August 10, 1975) is an Israeli kickboxer and former 8 times WPKA Kobukan Karate champion, currently competing in K-1 fighting circuit.

Biography and career
Ariel Mastov was born in Uzbekistan and grew up in Ashdod, Israel. In 2003 he immigrated to the United States, settling in Los Angeles, California. He is training at Legends Gym in Hollywood.

On August 12, 2006 Mastov made his K-1 debut at K-1 World GP 2006 in Las Vegas II against Michael McDonald as a late substitute for scheduled fighter Jeremy Williams who was not cleared to fight by Nevada State Athletic Commission. Mastov lost the bout via unanimous decision.

On August 11, 2007 Ariel was scheduled to participate on his second K-1 tournament at K-1 World GP 2007 in Las Vegas, but due to last minute pullout by Chalid Arrab he was replaced to fight Petr Vondracek on one of the Superfights, winning the bout by KO (spinning heel kick).

Titles 
 2000-2005 WPKA Japan Karate Heavyweight champion
 1999-2000 WPKA Israel Karate Heavyweight champion

Kickboxing record (Incomplete)

See also 
List of male kickboxers
List of K-1 Events

References

External links
Official K-1 website
Ariel Mastov K-1 profile
Official WPKA Kobukan website

1975 births
Living people
Heavyweight kickboxers
Israeli expatriates in the United States
Israeli male karateka
Israeli male kickboxers
Israeli people of Uzbekistani-Jewish descent
Jewish Israeli sportspeople
Uzbekistani emigrants to Israel
Uzbekistani Jews
Soviet emigrants to Israel
Soviet Jews